The Tat people of Iran (Tati: Irünə Tâtün) are an Iranian people living in northern Iran, especially in   Qazvin province.

Tats of Iran use the Tati language, a group of northwestern Iranian dialects which are closely related to the Talysh language. Persian and Azerbaijani are also spoken. Tats of Iran are mainly Muslim and number about 300,000.

Starting from the Middle Ages, the term Tati was used not only for the Caucasus but also for northwestern Iran, where it was extended to almost all of the local Iranian languages except Persian and Kurdish.

Currently, the term Tati and Tati language is used to refer to a particular group of north-western Iranian dialects (Chali, Danesfani, Hiaraji, Hoznini, Esfarvarini, Takestani, Sagzabadi, Ebrahimabadi, Eshtehardi, Hoini, Kajali, Shahroudi, Harzani) in Iranian Azerbaijan, as well as south of it in the provinces of Qazvin and Zanjan. These dialects have a certain affinity to the Talysh language, Mazanderani language and may be descendants of the extinct Old Azari language.

Notable Tat people
Alireza Jahanbakhsh, Iranian footballer who plays for  Iran and Feyenoord

See also
 Tat people (Caucasus)
 Tati language (Iran)
 Tat language (Caucasus)
 History of Tat people

References

External links
 Iranica entry on Eshtehārdi, one of Tati dialects
Sample of the Gozarkhani language

Iranian ethnic groups
Ethnic groups in Iran
Qazvin Province